The Jamaica Center–Parsons/Archer station (formerly Jamaica Center–Parsons Boulevard station and sometimes shortened as Jamaica Center station) is the northern terminal station of the IND and BMT Archer Avenue Lines of the New York City Subway, located at Parsons Boulevard and Archer Avenue in Jamaica, Queens. It is served by E and J trains at all times, as well as Z trains during rush hours in the peak direction.

This station opened on December 11, 1988, as Jamaica Center–Parsons Boulevard, and was renamed in 2004. The station is a major transfer point for buses from eastern Queens, and replaces the old 160th Street and 168th Street stations of the BMT Jamaica Line; the Jamaica Center station is located near the site of the former. It is also near the site of the Long Island Rail Road's now-demolished Union Hall Street station.

History

Construction and opening 
The plans for the Archer Avenue Lines emerged in the 1960s under the city and the Metropolitan Transportation Authority (MTA)'s Program for Action. The Archer Avenue subway's groundbreaking took place on August 15, 1972, at Archer Avenue and 151st Street, and the station's design started on December 7, 1973. By July 1974, when the federal government announced its approval of a $51.1 million grant for the project, the Parsons Boulevard station was expected to be used by 8,700 passengers during rush hours. Construction of two  tunnels under the nine tracks of the LIRR Main Line in Jamaica began in January 1976. The two tunnels were completed in May 1976; south of these tunnel segments, the line would have been extended south several hundred yards, but this extension was never built.

On September 26, 1980, $40 million of federal funding was transferred to the MTA to build the connection to the Jamaica Line, to complete the Parsons Boulevard station, and the installation of track along the line, including the section south of that station to South Road and 158th Street. Work continued on the connection to the Queens Boulevard Line.  The project's opening date at this juncture was October 1984. Plans for the station were completed in-house on June 17, 1981. Bids on the station construction were received on September 21, 1981, and was awarded to A. J. Pegno Construction Corporation for $22,425,415. Work on the station commenced on October 12, 1981.

Because of the 1975 New York City fiscal crisis, the Archer Avenue Line was never fully built to Springfield Boulevard, and was instead truncated to Parsons Boulevard. In October 1980, the MTA considered stopping work on the line and on the 63rd Street Line, due to its budget crisis and the bad state of the existing subway system. Due to lack of money, all bidding on new subway and bus projects for the MTA was suspended in 1981, except for the already-built portions of the 63rd Street and Archer Avenue lines, which were allowed to continue. In September 1983, the project was 80% complete, and was expected to be in operation in fall 1985. Construction was completed a year ahead of schedule, in 1983, but was delayed for several more years due to various disputes. The station opened along with the rest of the Archer Avenue Line on December 11, 1988.

Post-opening 
On December 14, 1991, a display titled "Astoria–Dreams of New York," a -long mural, consisting of seven portraits of first-generation Greek immigrants was removed from the station for not including any pictures of African Americans, seven days after going up. The artist, Eugenia Marketou, called the decision "censorship of the worst kind." The piece was removed at the request of the directors of the Arts for Transit program after a negative public reaction, which included their defacement with graffiti and protest stickers. A dozen African American riders had complained to the agency. On the same date, a $70,000 sculpture called "Jamaica Center Stations Riders, Blue," which was created by well-known African American artist Sam Gilliam, was unveiled at the station. The sculpture was funded through the MTA Arts for Transit program, which allocates 1 percent of capital construction costs for art projects. After negotiations between Marketou and his agency took place, it was reinstalled on February 6, 1992, with a banner stating "Portraits of the Greek Immigrant Community" added in addition to the tile. In addition, Marketou agreed to appear in front of it during three rush hours to explain it. One of the photographs was removed in the following two weeks. The exhibit was only scheduled to stay until May 6, 1992.

To save energy, the MTA installed variable-speed escalators at Jamaica Center–Parsons/Archer and three other subway stations in August 2008, although not all of the escalators initially functioned as intended.

In 2020, the MTA announced that it would reconstruct the track and third rail on the IND Archer Avenue Line, which had become deteriorated. From September 19 to November 2, 2020, E service was cut back to Jamaica–Van Wyck, with a shuttle bus connecting to Sutphin Boulevard and Jamaica Center. The MTA then announced it would reconstruct the track on the BMT Archer Avenue Line. Starting on July 1, 2022, J service was cut back to 121st Street, and Z service was temporarily discontinued, with a shuttle bus connecting to Sutphin Boulevard and Jamaica Center. The work was completed in September 2022.

Station layout

The Jamaica Center–Parsons/Archer station contains two levels, each with two tracks and an island platform. The E train serves the upper level (IND) at all times. The J and Z trains serve the lower level (BMT); the former operates all times and the latter operates during rush hours in the peak direction. Like the other stations on the Archer Avenue Line, Jamaica Center–Parsons/Archer is fully ADA-accessible.

As with other stations constructed as part of the Program for Action, the Jamaica Center–Parsons/Archer station contained technologically advanced features such as air-cooling, noise insulation, CCTV monitors, public announcement systems, electronic platform signage, and escalator and elevator entrances. This station has ten escalators and two elevators.

This station has tan brick walls and red brick floor on both levels. The coved trapezoidal ceilings are suspended and have metal slats.

Exits

There are two entrances to this station. The first one is at the very east end of the station and connects with Parsons Boulevard. It contains a mezzanine that has four escalators, two to each platform, and an ADA-accessible elevator serving both platforms. There is a large, single bank of turnstiles with nine turnstiles leading to fare control. One wide staircase and one escalator leads to a pavilion behind the streets at the northeast corner of Parsons Boulevard and Archer Avenue. A narrower staircase and escalator leads to the southeast corner. An elevator is present near the southeast corner of the intersection. This entrance contains a 1991 artwork called Jamaica Center Station Riders by Sam Gilliam made up of blue painted aluminum.

The second exit is near the middle of the platforms and connects with 153rd Street. Each platform contains two escalators to the mezzanine; the upper level also has one staircase to the mezzanine, while the lower level has two. In this mezzanine, there are fire regular turnstiles, five High Entry-Exit Turnstiles, and two high exit-only turnstiles. This entrance has three street stairs; two of them, one of which also has an up-only escalator, lead up to the south side of Archer Avenue outside the bus boarding area. The staircase with the escalator has a brickwork design surrounding it while the other staircase at this entrance has an ultra-wide green metal fence. There is another staircase at the northeast corner of Archer Avenue and 153rd Street.

Infrastructure
West of the station, both levels feature diamond crossovers. The upper level's crossover is just west of the platform, while the lower level is halfway between this station and Sutphin Boulevard–Archer Avenue.

The tracks on both levels extend past the station for possible future extensions, but are currently used for storage. This was a planned extension toward 190th Street–Hollis Avenue (near the Hollis LIRR station). Where the lower level tracks end, there is a provision for a diamond crossover switch at the end of the tunnel (under 160th Street). They then run under 160th Street within the York College campus and end at bumper blocks near Tuskegee Airmen Way (formerly South Road). This was the site of the line's original groundbreaking in 1973. The plan was for this line to use the LIRR Locust Manor Branch (Atlantic) ROW and run to Springfield Boulevard or Rosedale LIRR station. Where the upper level tracks stub end, there is a provision for a portal to go outside if the line going to Southeastern Queens is ever built. The tunnel was originally planned to curve west towards the Atlantic ROW just north of Liberty Avenue, running underneath the York College Athletic Field.

East of the upper-level platform, a Central Instrument Room (753CIR) is located deep in the tunnel on track D2A (upper level) bench wall.

East of the station, next to the D1A tail track on the upper level, the tunnel catwalk structure widens, and the track curves south along with the D2A track. Where the catwalk structure ends, there is a stairway to the lower level tail tracks.

Ridership
In 2018, the station had 10,681,269 boardings, making it the 27th most used station in the -station system. This amounted to an average of 922,959 passengers per weekday.

Gallery

Jamaica Center Bus Terminal

The subway complex includes the Jamaica Center Bus Terminal, a series of bus stops located along Archer Avenue (primarily along the south side of the street next to the LIRR right of way). The bus stop areas are lettered A through H. The western portion of the terminal (bays F through H and the bus layover area) is also known as the "Teardrop Canopy". It serves as a major transit hub within Jamaica. The former 160th Street Jamaica Elevated station on Jamaica Avenue that it replaced was also a major hub for trolley service when it was originally built. Several of the trolley lines were the predecessors to current bus service.

Jamaica Center is also a hub for dollar vans in the New York metropolitan area.

Nearby points of interest 
 King Manor
 York College
 Jamaica Center for Arts & Learning

References

External links

 
 Station Reporter — E Train
 Station Reporter — J Train
 The Subway Nut — Jamaica Center–Parsons/Archer Pictures
 MTA's Arts For Transit — Jamaica Center–Parsons/Archer
 Parsons Boulevard entrance from Google Maps Street View
 153rd Street entrance from Google Maps Street View
 158th Street entrance from Google Maps Street View
 Upper level from Google Maps Street View
Lower level from Google Maps Street View

Archer Avenue Line stations
Program for Action
New York City Subway stations in Queens, New York
Railway stations in the United States opened in 1988
New York City Subway transfer stations
Jamaica, Queens
1988 establishments in New York City
New York City Subway terminals